Franco Cozzo (born 2 October, 1936 in Ramacca, Sicily) is an Italian-Australian businessman. Arriving in Melbourne in 1955, Cozzo is now best-known for his TV advertisements which featured him speaking direct-to-customers in English, Greek, and Italian. However, he is perhaps most significant for producing Australia's first non-english TV show, Carosello, which was instead broadcast in italian.

Although tastes in furniture have changed, Cozzo remains a cultural icon. For over 50 years, he has been one of the most visible proponents of multiculturalism in Victoria.

Biography
Cozzo grew up with his family in Sicily, where his father was a horse trader. When he was 12, Cozzo's young sister died of a heart attack.

His background actually consists of an Italian father and a Greek mother, contrary to the popular belief that he is 100% ethnic Italian.

After migrating to Australia in January 1956, Cozzo initially worked as a door-to-door salesman. Owing to a limited knowledge of English, he learnt to identify the homes of Italians, Greeks, and other ethnic groups that were migrating to Australia thanks to the post-war relaxation of the White Australia policy, which restricted immigration to prevent most ethnic groups from outside the British isles from coming to the country.

Cozzo focused on this largely-ignored, but new and growing segment of the market. In his early days, Cozzo sold everything he could, not just the baroque furniture he is now largely associated with. His first shop in North Melbourne also sold whitegoods and for a brief time, he also had a Fiat dealership.

In the late 1960s, Cozzo produced a TV show featuring local Italian-Australian musical acts on Channel 0, largely as an advertising vehicle for his furniture business. This was the first Australian TV show that was not broadcast in English, pre-dating ethnic broadcasting on the government's Special Broadcasting Service by more than a decade. Around this time, he also purchased what would become his flagship store in Footscray.

By 1981, Cozzo's distinctive advertising of his Footscray store had raised the suburb's profile so much that the local council awarded him a plaque to recognise his contribution to the local community.

Cozzo divorced his first wife during the 1980s, before marrying again and having more children with his second wife. 

Cozzo's son, Luigi, was jailed in 1992 for drug trafficking, having imported drugs by hiding them in his father's furniture shipments.

Cultural impact
Cozzo is a cultural icon in his adoptive home of Melbourne, and especially the suburb of Footscray, which he distinctively pronounces Footisgray in his TV ads. His distinctive Italian accent and trilingual ads set him apart from everything else on the Anglo-Australian television stations, and he was one of the most prominent ethnic TV personalities  prior to the launch of the government-funded Special Broadcasting Service.

Norda Melbin E Footisgray by Tony Curiso was a stereotypically Italian tune with lyrics that are based on Cozzo's television advertisements. Recorded during his heights in the 1980s, the song highlighted the strength of Cozzo's brand, and even featured a special introduction recorded by the man himself.

The Argotiers 2020 song, I Wanna Die in a Franco Cozzo Bed is another song by a Melbourne artist that references the furniture magnate, or more specifically his wares. The song paints the picture of a bedroom furnished in the baroque style that made Cozzo millions.

Cozzo was the subject of Palazzo di Cozzo, a biographical documentary film that examined his life and used his experiences as an Italian-Australian businessman from the 1950s to 2020s as a lens to view the changing acceptance of postwar southern European migrants to Australia which debuted at the 2021 Melbourne International Film Festival.

References

External links
 francocozzo.com.au
 Franco Cozzo TV Commercial Melbourne 1980s (Rebroadcast in 2014) - YouTube
 Carosello (1968) ATV-0 Melbourne - YouTube

1936 births
Living people
20th-century Italian businesspeople
21st-century Italian businesspeople
People from Ramacca
Businesspeople from Sicily